A driver development program (or driver development team) is a system or structure designed for young kart and race car drivers to learn and perfect their racing skills. These programmes are devised by racing teams, external companies and funded partnerships primarily to attract and develop future racing talent. Most programmes now employ a wide range of skilled coaches and technologies to train all of the physical and psychological abilities inherent in driving at the limit and winning races. Most racing teams will sign a driver to a multi-year contract in which they fund or part fund the driver in junior formulas (such as Formula 3 and Formula 2 in Europe, and Late models and ARCA in stock car racing) and gradually help them succeed to the highest levels of motorsport. Some teams have been criticized for unfair long-term and low-paying contracts for the talented drivers they find whilst also charging the less talented drivers very high fees for the use of their simulations and facilities. Companies that specialise in racing driver training or development programmes remain commercially viable through selling time in their simulators or gyms and generally speaking do not fund a drivers career. Funded partnerships, good driver management companies and driver search and development initiatives will fund or part fund a drivers development and will survive as long as the owners financial commitment and or success at recouping their investment. Be that a return from a talented drivers wages or a promotional exercise designed by a brand or corporation.

The following is a list of teams that currently have a driver development programs or are driver development teams.

Open wheel racing

Formula One
 Alpine Academy – Alpine F1 Team Driver Programme
 Ferrari Driver Academy – Scuderia Ferrari Driver Programme
 Mercedes Junior Team – Mercedes AMG Petronas Driver Programme
 McLaren Young Driver Programme – McLaren F1 team Driver Programme
 Red Bull Junior Team – Red Bull Racing and Scuderia AlphaTauri Driver Programme
 Sauber Junior Team – Alfa Romeo Racing Driver Programme
 Williams Driver Academy – Williams F1 Team Driver Programme
 AMF1 Driver Development Programme  – Aston Martin F1 Driver Programme

IndyCar
 Andretti Autosport – Hunter McElrea, Louis Foster. Jamie Chadwick, James Roe Jr. (all Indy NXT)
 Chip Ganassi Racing – Kyffin Simpson (Indy NXT)

 Dale Coyne Racing – Christian Bogle, Danial Frost, Nolan Siegel, Josh Green, Christian Rasmussen, Rasmus Lindh(all Indy NXT)
 Ed Carpenter Racing – Josh Pierson (Indy NXT)
 Juncos Hollinger Racing – Matteo Nannini, Reece Gold (both Indy NXT)

 Team Penske – Myles Rowe (USF Pro 2000)

Super Formula
 KCMG Driver Development Project
 Honda Formula Dream Project
 TGR-DC Racing School

NASCAR
All of these teams have their own developmental driver programs and/or field cars/trucks on their team for developmental drivers.

 B. J. McLeod Motorsports
 Jairo Avila Jr.
 Josh Bilicki
 Mason Massey
 Vinnie Miller
 Matt Mills

 Chip Ganassi Racing
 Ross Chastain

 DGM Racing
 Dillon Bassett
 Ronnie Bassett Jr.
 Alex Labbé
 Josh Williams

 DGR-Crosley (also part of Ford Performance)
 Hailie Deegan
 Tanner Gray
 Taylor Gray
 Thad Moffitt

 GMS Racing and JR Motorsports (Drivers Edge Development)
 Tyler Ankrum
 Josh Berry
 Toni Breidinger
 Jeb Burton
 Sheldon Creed
 Noah Gragson
 David Gravel
 Carson Hocevar
 Adam Lemke
 Sam Mayer
 Brett Moffitt
 Connor Mosack
 Zane Smith

 Hattori Racing Enterprises
 Austin Hill
 Max McLaughlin

 JD Motorsports
 Jeffrey Earnhardt
 Colby Howard
 Jesse Little
 Robby Lyons

 Jimmy Means Racing
 Kody Vanderwal

 Joe Gibbs Racing 
 Harrison Burton
 Ty Gibbs
 Riley Herbst
 Brandon Jones 

 Kaulig Racing
 Ross Chastain
 Justin Haley

 Kyle Busch Motorsports
 Christian Eckes
 Raphaël Lessard

 MBM Motorsports
 Chad Finchum

 Niece Motorsports
 Jeb Burton
 Natalie Decker
 Carson Hocevar
 Jett Noland
 Ty Majeski
 Ryan Truex

 On Point Motorsports 
 Danny Bohn
 Brennan Poole

 Richard Childress Racing 
 Anthony Alfredo
 Kaz Grala
 Myatt Snider

 RSS Racing
 C. J. McLaughlin
 Myatt Snider

 Sam Hunt Racing
 Colin Garrett

 SS-Green Light Racing
 Ray Black Jr.
 Joe Graf Jr.

 Stewart-Haas Racing (also part of Ford Performance)
 Chase Briscoe

 Team Penske (also part of Ford Performance)
 Austin Cindric

 ThorSport Racing (also part of Ford Performance)
 Grant Enfinger
 Ben Rhodes

See also
 Drive for Diversity
 Drivers Edge Development
 Porsche Junioren
 VMB Driver Development

References

Motorsport terminology
 
Driver's education